The R628 road is a regional road from near Rathcormac in County Cork to Tallow, County Waterford in Ireland, via the village of Conna.

References

Regional roads in the Republic of Ireland
Roads in County Cork
Roads in County Waterford